Benjamin Huger is the name of several prominent men from South Carolina:

Benjamin Huger (American Revolution) (1746–1779), militia officer killed near Charleston
Benjamin Huger (congressman) (1768–1823), served in state and federal legislatures
Benjamin Huger (Confederate general) (1805–1877), Civil War Confederate general, veteran of the Mexican–American War